Fighter Pilot is a combat flight simulation game developed by Charybdis Enterprises and published by Electronic Arts for Windows in 1998.

Reception

The game received unfavorable reviews according to the review aggregation website GameRankings.

References

External links
 

1998 video games
Combat flight simulators
Electronic Arts games
Multiplayer and single-player video games
Windows games
Windows-only games
Video games developed in the United States